The Cork Intermediate A Football Championship (known for sponsorship reasons as Bon Secours Cork County Intermediate A Football Championship and abbreviated to the Cork IAFC) is an annual Gaelic football competition organised by the Cork County Board of the Gaelic Athletic Association and contested by the second tier intermediate clubs in the county of Cork in Ireland. It is the fourth tier overall in the entire Cork football championship system.

The Cork Intermediate Championship was introduced in 1909 as a competition that would bridge the gap between the senior grade and the junior grade. At the time of its creation it was the second tier of Cork football.

In its current format, the Cork Intermediate Championship begins in mid summer. The 16 participating club teams are drawn into four groups of four teams and play each other in a round-robin system. The two group winners proceed to the knockout phase that culminates with the final match at Páirc Uí Chaoimh. The winner of the Cork Intermediate Championship, as well as being presented with the Seán Ó Súilleabháin Cup, gains automatic promotion to the Cork Premier Intermediate Championship for the following season.

Bantry Blues is the most successful teams in the tournament's history, having won it six times. Kilshannig are the reigning champions, having beaten Aghabullogue by 1-16 to 0-10 in the 2022 final.

Format

Development
On 2 April 2019, a majority of 136 club delegates voted to restructure the championship. The new format limited the number of participating clubs to 16.

Stages
Group stage: The 16 teams are divided into four groups of four. Over the course of the group stage, which features one game in April and two games in August, each team plays once against the others in the group, resulting in each team being guaranteed at least three games. Two points are awarded for a win, one for a draw and zero for a loss. The teams are ranked in the group stage table by points gained, then scoring difference and then their head-to-head record. The top two teams in each group qualify for the knockout stage and the bottom team in each group enter the relegation playoffs.

Relegation Playoffs: The bottom team is relegated to the Cork Premier Junior Football Championship.

Quarter-finals: The eight group stage winners contest this round. The four winners from these four games advance to the semi-finals.

Semi-finals: The four quarter-final winners contest this round. The two winners from these four games advance to the semi-finals.

Final: The two semi-final winners contest the final. The winning team are declared champions and gain automatic promotion to the following year's Cork Premier Intermediate Football Championship.

2023 Teams

Sponsorship
In keeping with its sponsorship deal for all Cork hurling and football championships, Permanent TSB provided the sponsorship since the 1990s. The Evening Echo became the primary sponsors of all Cork hurling and football championships in 2005 and have continued their sponsorship ever since.

Venues

Early rounds

Fixtures in the opening rounds of the championship are usually played at a neutral venue that is deemed halfway between the participating teams.

Final
The final has always been played at one of Cork GAA's two main stadiums. On several occasions the final has been played at Páirc Uí Chaoimh as the curtain raiser to the senior final, however, in recent times Páirc Uí Rinn has been the venue of choice for the final.

Trophy
The winning team is presented with the Seán Ó Súilleabháin Cup. A secondary school teacher by profession, John Lock O'Sullivan (1976-2002) played with the Adrigole club and the Beara divisional team, with whom he won the Cork Senior Championship in 1997.  He also lined out for Cork as a member of the under-21 and junior teams. O'Sullivan died suddenly on 19 November 2002.

List of finals

 1927 Nemo Rangers and Kilmurry were disqualified after meeting in the other semi-final

Roll of Honour

References

Cork Intermediate Football Championship
 2
Intermediate Gaelic football county championships